The Blue Palace was built as the heir's palace in Cetinje, Montenegro. Today the Blue Palace is the official residence of the President of Montenegro.

It was built in 1894–1895 in late Empire style as the residence of Crown Prince Danilo of Montenegro, then heir-apparent to the throne. The building was a model for the construction of other buildings for the members of the Petrović-Njegoš dynasty throughout Montenegro.

External links

Cetinje
Royal residences in Montenegro
Houses completed in 1895
Presidential residences
19th-century establishments in Montenegro